The following is a list of churches in Poole and Upton.

List of current churches 

 All Saints Church, Branksome
Bible Baptist Church, Poole
Broadstone Baptist Church
Broadstone Methodist Church Centre
Broadstone United Reformed Church
Buckland Road Baptist Church
Calvary Pentecostal Church
Christ Church Creekmoor
Church Of Scientology Mission Of Dorset
Church of the Good Shepherd, Rossmore
Dementia Friendly Church, Poole
First Church of Christ, Scientist, Poole
Gateway Church, Alder Road
Grace Church Waterloo, Poole
Kingdom Seekers Church Poole
Kings Church Poole
Life Church, Poole
Longfleet Baptist Church
Our Lady of Fatima Church
Parkstone Church
Parkstone Baptist Church
Parkstone Christadelphian Church
Parkstone United Reformed Church
Poole Christian Fellowship
Poole Christian Spiritualist Church
Poole Methodist Church
 Poole United Reformed Church, Skinner Street
Poole Vineyard Church
Quakers Religious Society of Friends, Poole
Redeemed Christian Church of God Parkstone, Poole, 16 Commercial Rd, Poole BH14 0JW
Rossmore Gospel Church
Salvation Army Church, Poole
Sandbanks St. Nicholas' Church
St Aldhelm's Church, Poole
St Anthony of Padua Roman Catholic Church, Broadstone
St. Clement's Church, Parkstone
Saint Dunstan's Church, Upton
 St Dunstan of Canterbury Orthodox Church
St. Gabriels Church, Hamworthy Church
St George's Church, Oakdale
 St James' Church, Poole
St John's Church, Broadstone
St. John's Church, Heatherlands Parkstone
St. Joseph's and St. Walburga's Catholic Church
St. Luke's Church, Parkstone
St Mary's Church, Longfleet
St Mary's Roman Catholic Church Poole
St. Paul's Church, Canford Heath
St. Peter's Church, Parkstone
Sunnyhill Church
The Beacon Church United Reformed, Canford Heath
The Church of Jesus Christ of Latter-Day Saints
The Church of the Holy Angels, Lilliput
The Church Of The Transfiguration, Canford Cliffs and Sandbanks
Upton Methodist Church
Waters Edge Elim Church

Former churches 

 Longfleet United Reformed Church (closed December 2021)

References 

Poole
Poole
Poole